Qeshlaq Baba Rostam (also Romanized as Qeshlāq Bābā Rostam; also known as Qeshlāq) is a village in Shaban Rural District, in the Central District of Nahavand County, Hamadan Province, Iran. At the 2006 census, its population was 105, in 26 families.

References 

Populated places in Nahavand County